Military equipment of the Estonian Defence Forces is a list of modern military equipment currently in service with the Estonian Defence Forces.

Weapons

Small arms

Anti-tank weapons

Anti-aircraft weapons

Anti-ship weapons

Grenades

Artillery

Vehicles

Armoured vehicles

Artillery

Logistics vehicles

Engineering vehicles

Unmanned ground vehicles

Ships

Mine countermeasures vessels

Auxiliary vessels

Aircraft

Fixed-wing aircraft

Helicopters

Unmanned aerial vehicles

Radars

See also
Former equipment of the Maavägi
List of equipment of the Estonian Defence League
List of active Estonian Navy ships
List of Estonian Navy ships
Estonian Air Force Equipment
List of historic Estonian Air Force aircraft
Estonian Special Operations Force Equipment

References

External links
 Equipment - Estonian Defence Forces 

 
Estonian Defence Forces
Estonian Defence Forces